Ian Richards (born 1 January 1965) is a South African cricketer. He played in one List A and seven first-class matches for Boland from 1987/88 to 1989/90.

See also
 List of Boland representative cricketers

References

External links
 

1965 births
Living people
South African cricketers
Boland cricketers
Cricketers from Johannesburg